Eleutherococcus is a genus of 38 species of thorny shrubs and trees in the family Araliaceae. They are native to eastern Asia, from southeast Siberia and Japan to the Philippines and Vietnam. 18 species come from China, from central to western parts.

Perhaps the best known in the West is the species E. senticosus used as herbal medicine, and commonly known by such English names as Eleuthero or Siberian ginseng. In Traditional Chinese medicine, this is administered to increase energy, thus traditionally recognized to have attributes akin to true ginseng (Panax). This is also reflected in its formerly used genus name Acanthopanax meaning "thorny ginseng". The word "Eleutherococcus," from Greek, means "free-berried."

The European Medicines Agency has concluded that there is insufficient evidence to demonstrate the efficacy of Eleutherococcus for any clinical condition.

Naming
The Chinese materia medica in question   may designate a number of species. But the plant now given the common name wujia in China is specifically E. gracilistylus, and according to one source, the genuine crude drug must come from this species, and C. spinosum is only a substitute.

The Japanese name  borrows directly from the Chinese name, and refers somewhat broadly to several plants in the genus. A  10th century herbology text, Honzō wamyō,  introduced the Chinese wujia as an herb to be pronounced mu-ko-gi, refers specifically to E. sieboldianus (Japanese name: hime-ukogi). (See #Species list below).

The taxonomical nomenclature in the botanical science also has had a sinuous history, so that Acanthopanax had been used as the proper genus name in China till recent years, while the West adopted Eleutherococcus as the official name.

Several species are also grown as ornamental garden shrubs.  In Japan, they have been planted as hedges. Particularly in Yamagata Prefecture, a daimyō named Uesugi Yōzan encouraged the planting of the ukogi as fencing around the homes of samurai retainers (E. sieboldianus was planted in the region), and the bitter young buds, leaves and stems have traditionally been picked and eaten as vegetable in the area. However, since the plant is deciduous, it requires sweeping in the fall (high maintenance), and the bare hedges fail to protect the homeowner's privacy.

Fossil record
The four earliest fossil species of Eleutherococcus are from the Maastrichtian (about 70 Ma) floras of Eisleben and Walbeck, Germany, the synonym Acanthopanax is used for these species †A. friedrichii, †A. gigantocarpus, †A. mansfeldensis and †A. obliquocostatus.

Species

Eleutherococcus baoxinensis
Eleutherococcus brachypus
Eleutherococcus cissifolius
Eleutherococcus cuspidatus
Eleutherococcus divaricatus, Ja:, aka oni-ukogi. Found in central and southern Japan, Korean peninsula, and Chinese mainland, with many flowers arranged in conical inflorescence
Eleutherococcus eleutheristylus
Eleutherococcus giraldii
Eleutherococcus gracilistylus
Eleutherococcus henryi
Eleutherococcus higoensis, Ja:
Eleutherococcus huangshanensis
Eleutherococcus hypoleucus, Ja:, growing in limestone soils in Honshu, Shikoku, Kyushu
Eleutherococcus japonicus, Ja:, aka tsukushi-ukogi, maruba-ukogi. Grows in hilly terrain, of Kanto, Tokai, Kii Peninsula.
Eleutherococcus lasiogyne
Eleutherococcus leucorrhizus
Eleutherococcus nanpingensis
Eleutherococcus nikaianus, Ja:, variety found in Honshu, Shikoku, Kyushu with yellow-green flowers and blackish-purple fruits.
Eleutherococcus nodiflorus
Eleutherococcus pilosulus
Eleutherococcus pseudosetulosus
Eleutherococcus pubescens
Eleutherococcus rehderianus
Eleutherococcus rufinervis
Eleutherococcus scandens
 Eleutherococcus senticosus (Rupr. & Maxim.) Maxim.,  (エゾウコギ), species found in Hokkaido, with many white flowers in globular clusters;
 Eleutherococcus seoulensis
 Eleutherococcus sessiliflorus
 Eleutherococcus setchuensis
 Eleutherococcus setulosus
 Eleutherococcus sieboldianus (Makino) Koidz., Ja:, native to China's mainland.
 Eleutherococcus simonii
 Eleutherococcus spinosus (L. f.) S.Y. Hu, Ja:, growing widely in Honshu and Shikoku, with white flowers in globular inflorescence
Eleutherococcus stenophyllus
Eleutherococcus trichodon, Ja:, found widely in Honshu and Shikoku
Eleutherococcus trifoliatus (L. f.) S.Y. Hu
Eleutherococcus verticillatus
Eleutherococcus wardii
Eleutherococcus wilsonii
Eleutherococcus xizangensis

Formerly under Acanthopanax
 Various Eleutherococcus spp.
 Acanthopanax ricinifolium → Kalopanax septemlobus
Eleutherococcus sciadophylloides, koshiabura (コシアブラ) → Chengiopanax sciadophylloides

References

External links

 
 

 

 
Apiales genera